SS John J. Crittenden was a Liberty ship built in the United States during World War II. She was named after John J. Crittenden, an American politician from Kentucky. He represented the state in both the US House of Representatives and the US Senate and twice served as United States Attorney General in the administrations of William Henry Harrison, John Tyler, and Millard Fillmore. He was also the 17th governor of Kentucky and served in the state legislature.

Construction
John J. Crittenden was laid down on 15 October 1942, under a Maritime Commission (MARCOM) contract, MC hull 1196, by the St. Johns River Shipbuilding Company, Jacksonville, Florida; she was sponsored by Mrs. Earl D. Page, the wife of the treasurer of the St. John's River SB Co., she was launched on 7 May 1943.

History
She was allocated to A.H. Bull & Co., Inc., on 24 June 1943. On 10 July 1948, she was placed in the National Defense Reserve Fleet, Wilmington, North Carolina. She was sold for scrapping, on 4 April 1968, to Union Minerals and Alloys. She was delivered, 15 May 1968.

References

Bibliography

 
 
 
 

 

Liberty ships
Ships built in Jacksonville, Florida
1943 ships
Wilmington Reserve Fleet